Cibyra brasiliensis is a species of moth of the family Hepialidae. It is known from Brazil, from which its species epithet is derived.

References

External links
Hepialidae genera

Moths described in 1952
Hepialidae